The Batik bent-toed gecko (Cyrtodactylus batik) is a species of gecko endemic to Sulawesi.

References

Cyrtodactylus
Reptiles described in 2011